Rufus Rivers Meadows (born August 25, 1907 in Chase City, Virginia) was a left-handed pitcher in Major League Baseball for the Cincinnati Reds in 1926. He appeared in just one game, an 18-1 loss to the Chicago Cubs. Meadows faced the Cubs' final batter of the game, inducing an out to finish off the blowout loss by his Reds. He is the only pitcher to face only one batter in his only MLB game.

Meadows was only 18 when he had his brief moment as a major leaguer, and he was the second-youngest player to play in the National League that season, trailing only future Hall of Famer Mel Ott.

Meadows died May 10, 1970 in Wichita, Kansas.

References

1907 births
1970 deaths
Baseball players from Virginia
Cincinnati Reds players
Major League Baseball pitchers
People from Chase City, Virginia
Nashville Vols players